Cost of poor quality (COPQ) or poor quality costs (PQC), are costs that would disappear if systems, processes, and products were perfect.

COPQ was popularized by IBM quality expert H. James Harrington in his 1987  book Poor Quality Costs.
COPQ is a refinement of the concept of quality costs.  In the 1960s, IBM undertook an effort to study its own quality costs and tailored the concept for its own use.  While Feigenbaum's term "quality costs" is technically accurate, it's easy for the uninitiated to jump to the conclusion that better quality products cost more to produce.  Harrington adopted the name "poor quality costs" to emphasize the belief that investment in detection and prevention of product failures is more than offset by the savings in reductions in product failures.

Harrington breaks down COPQ into the following elements:

Examples

White collar COPQ

Harrington noted that expanding cost analyses to management and clerical workers could also make a significant dent in waste.  He defined the following costs by functional area:

Cost of poor quality by inception point
 
The damages of poor quality augment as the inception point is further down the supply chain:
TCFP [Total Cost of Faulty Part] =
Direct Cost (manufacturing cost)
								➔ failure at supplier's site (bad)
+ Labor Cost (assembly and testing)
+ Overhead Cost (Inventory, handling, shipping costs)
+ Scrapping Cost (of part and attached parts assemblies: Sometimes assemblies cannot be disassembled and have to be scrapped altogether)
+ Rework (applying a new part instead)	
								➔ failure at manufacturer's site (worse)
+ Repair / Recall Costs (these are costs associated with repairing or replacing a new part / assembly under warranty)
+ Product Liability Costs (These are costs resulting from damages caused by the faulty part to 3rd parties)
								➔ failure at customers' site (worst)

See also
Gold in the mine
Quality costs

References

Costs
Quality control